Camellia yunnanensis is a 1.3–7 m tall shrub or small tree endemic to China.

Its leaves are elliptic to broad-elliptic or ovate-elliptic, bluntly acute. They are deep green.

Its flowers is white, perulate and solitary.

Distribution
It is distributed in Sichuan, Yunnan, and Guizhou Provinces, China.

The plants was introduced to Japan after 1979 in the form of seeds and scions for grafting.

References

yunnanensis
Endemic flora of China
Flora of Guizhou
Flora of Sichuan
Flora of Yunnan